The mangrove semaphore gecko (Pristurus obsti) is a species of lizard in the family Sphaerodactylidae. The species is endemic to Socotra Island.

Etymology
The specific name, obsti, is in honor of German herpetologist Fritz Jürgen Obst (1939–2018).

Geographic range
P. obsti is only found on Socotra Island, which is part of Yemen

Reproduction
P. obsti is oviparous.

References

Further reading
Rösler, Herbert; Wranik, Wolfgang (1999). "Beiträge zur Herpetologie der Republik Jemen 5. Drei neue Gecko-Arten vom Sokotra-Archipel (Reptilia: Sauria: Gekkonidae) ". Zoologische Abhandlungen, Staatliches Museum für Tierkunde Dresden 50: 249–265. (Pristurus obsti, new species, pp. 254–259, Figures 4–7). (in German, with an abstract in English).

Pristurus
Reptiles described in 1999
Endemic fauna of Socotra